Mohadeseh Goudasiai (born 12 June 2000 in Iran) is an Iranian footballer who plays as a midfielder for the Iran under-19 national team. She is a student of sports sciences and the first lady with a record in Iran. Her first record in Milad Tower with 8694 rupees in one hour and her second record is Asian which lasted 3 hours and 11 minutes and was recorded about 21 thousand rupees.

Honors 
Goudasiai is a member of the national youth team and has been sent to Thailand, Vietnam, Uzbekistan and Russia. She is honored to be the runner-up in the Central Asian Cup in Uzbekistan and the fourth place in the international tournament in Sochi with Russia in the national team.

She plays in the national football premier league and is also a player on the students' national team. Mohadeseh Goodasiai is the goal scorer of the 97th Alborz Premier League with 27 goals in 7 games.

Referee 
GoudAsiaei is also a 2nd-grade football referee who (3rd-grade referee was taken at the age of 14, who was named the youngest referee in Iran)

She has also held the coaching degree of Asia Football D and the level 1 futsal of Iran and Rikamand in both classes.

References 

 محدثه گود آسیایی هافبک راست تیم بانوان هیئت فوتبال البرز که رکورد دار روپایی آسیا را نیز در کارنامه خود دارد در کلاس مربیگری D آسیا نفر اول شد
 از ناتوانی در روپایی زدن تا حضور در تیم ملی با دختر فوتبالیست و رکورددار ایران
 محدثه آسیایی جوان‌ترین داور فوتبال ایران شناخته شد
 https://shahrvand-newspaper.ir/news:nomobile/main/116441/توجه-وزیر-ورزش-به-دختر-روپایی‌زن
 http://alborz.pnu.ac.ir/portal/PrintPage/PrintPage.aspx?categoryid=e6d241d8-907a-4747-9602-69974cb1eba4&id=df12fc99-e50a-4876-920b-e2d243240fd8&object=news&webpartid=ec071aa5-9dd3-4f28-865b-d3a59faef71b
 برگزاری دومین صندلی داغ مجازی به مدیریت تربیت بدنی دانشگاه پیام نور استان البرز
 https://www.ilna.news/بخش-ورزشی-7/458130-از-ناتوانی-در-روپایی-زدن-تا-حضور-در-تیم-ملی-با-دختر-فوتبالیست-رکورددار-ایران
 http://best-biography.ir/post/1460/بیوگرافی-محدثه-گود-آسیایی.html
 https://farsi.iranpress.com/iran-i113205
 https://www.medu.ir/fa/news/ctg-id/8784/اخبار-مهم?ocode=1000000264&page=419
 https://www.mojnews.com/بخش-ورزشی-7/180626-اسامی-بازیکنان-دعوت-شده-به-اردوی-تیم-ملی-فوتبال-جوانان-بانوان-اعلام-شد#gsc.tab=0
 http://alborz.irib.ir/-/دانش-اموز-البرزی-رکوردارورزش-روپایی-دختران-در-کشور-شد
 https://www.borna.news/بخش-ورزشی-7/510845-دعوت-بازیکن-جدید-به-اردوی-انتخابی-تیم-فوتبال-جوانان-بانوان
 https://www.kebnanews.ir/news/262206/print/دعوت-یک-کهگیلویه-بویراحمدی-اردوی-تیم-ملی-فوتبال-بانوان

External links 

 Instagram
 Facebook
 Mohadeseh Good Asian, the right midfielder of the Alborz Women's Football Team, who also holds the record for Asian Rupai in his record, won first place in the D-Asia coaching class.
 Watch the very interesting interview with Mohadeseh Good Asia, the only record-breaking lady in Iran ...
 Aparat

2000 births
Living people
Iranian footballers
Association football midfielders